Binač or Binça, is a village in the municipality of Vitina in southeastern Kosovo. The Binač Monastery was destroyed in 1999, during the Kosovo unrests. It is in the Kosovo Pomoravlje region. The Binačka Morava crosses beside the village.

See also
Populated places in Kosovo

References 

Villages in Viti, Kosovo
Medieval Serbian sites in Kosovo